Miguel Pérez Cuesta (born 21 March 1986), known as Michu, is a Spanish former professional footballer who played as a striker or attacking midfielder.

He started playing for Real Oviedo, subsequently representing Celta and Rayo Vallecano, making his La Liga debut with the latter in 2011–12. In 2012 he signed with Swansea City, scoring 22 goals in all competitions in his first season and winning the League Cup.

Despite performances that earned him an international debut for Spain in 2013, Michu fell out of favour at Swansea due to several injury problems, being loaned to Napoli and released in November 2015. He appeared for Langreo and Oviedo before retiring.

Club career

Oviedo and Celta

Michu was born in Oviedo, Asturias. After beginning with local Real Oviedo in the lower leagues, he moved to Celta de Vigo B of Segunda División B in the middle of 2007; midway through his first season he received his maiden first-team callup, eventually finishing in the starting XI of the Segunda División side.

In mid-January 2010, a transfer to La Liga with Sporting de Gijón in order to replace Birmingham City-bound Míchel was almost arranged, but it eventually fell through and Michu stayed at Celta. In his last two second-tier campaigns, he totalled 12 goals for the Galicians.

On 8 June 2011, after helping the club to sixth position in the regular season, Michu netted the game's only goal in the first leg of the promotion play-offs against Granada CF, at home; in the second leg, however, he missed his penalty shootout attempt and his team was eliminated (5–4).

Rayo Vallecano

On 27 July 2011, after his contract with Celta expired, Michu signed a two-year deal with Rayo Vallecano, newly promoted to the top division. He made his debut in the competition on 28 August, in a 1–1 away draw with Athletic Bilbao.

Michu was one of the best national scorers in his first season (joint-ninth overall, best in the midfielder position), notably scoring braces against Real Sociedad (4–0 home win), Racing de Santander (4–2, home), CA Osasuna (6–0, home) and Real Madrid, the latter albeit in a 6–2 away loss.

Swansea City

On 20 July 2012, Michu signed a three-year contract with Premier League side Swansea City for a fee of £2 million. Following the departure of Gylfi Sigurðsson, the club was looking for someone to fill the gap behind the striker in their 4–2–3–1 formation. He was given the number 9 shirt upon his transfer, and subsequently began featuring as a striker.

On his league debut on 18 August 2012, Michu scored twice and provided an assist for Scott Sinclair in a 5–0 away victory over Queens Park Rangers at Loftus Road. The first of his goals was also the first scored in the new top-flight season, and he later described his debut as "incredible".

Michu stayed atop the scoring charts by netting the second in a 3–0 home defeat of West Ham United on 25 August, and the second in the 2–2 draw against Sunderland the following matchday.

Michu scored his first FA Cup goal on 6 January 2013, coming off the bench in an eventual 2–2 home draw against Arsenal in the third round and finding the net a mere 73 seconds after entering the pitch. He followed this with another in his team's 2–0 win at Chelsea in the semi-finals of the Football League Cup.

On 23 January 2013, Michu signed a new four-year contract. On 24 February he scored the second in a 5–0 victory over Bradford City to help the side to win the League Cup for the first time in their history, in what was his 19th official goal of the campaign. he was subsequently named the team's Player of the Year, as well as the supporters Player of the Year.

Michu scored Swansea's first goal of 2013–14 on 1 August 2013, in the club's 4–0 home win against Malmö FF in the third qualifying round of the UEFA Europa League. In the play-off tie against FC Petrolul Ploiești later that month, he netted the second in a 5–1 victory, also at home. However, injuries limited his impact for much of the season.

Loan to Napoli and injuries
On 17 July 2014, Michu moved on loan to S.S.C. Napoli of Serie A, with the option of a permanent move. He made his debut for his new team on 31 August, coming on as an 85th-minute substitute for Lorenzo Insigne in a 2–1 win at Genoa. 

A recurrence of his ankle injury meant that Michu could only play six competitive matches for the Italians, and having not appeared for Swansea since April 2014, he was released on 9 November 2015 through a financial settlement, with his contract due to expire the following summer.

Later career
Immediately after leaving Swansea, Michu joined Asturian amateurs UP Langreo. On 19 August 2016 he returned to his first club Oviedo, signing a one-year deal.

Michu officially announced his retirement from professional football on 25 July 2017 at the age of 31, due to the 'situation of [his] right ankle'. The previous week, he commented that he would like to stay connected with football.

Along with players such as Roque Santa Cruz and Amr Zaki, Michu was described as a 'one-season wonder' by sports outlets due to his performances in 2012–13 followed by his rapid decline thereafter.

International career
On 22 December 2012, courtesy of his performances with Swansea, Vicente del Bosque said that Michu would play for Spain for the first time in a friendly with Uruguay on 6 February of the following year. However, he did not make the final squad for that match.

Michu was finally called up to the national team on 6 October 2013, as a replacement for the injured David Villa. He made his debut five days later, starting in a 2014 FIFA World Cup qualifier against Belarus in Palma de Mallorca (2–1 win).

Post-retirement
On 3 June 2018, Michu was appointed as director of football of Langreo, where his brother acted as head coach. He left the position on 3 April 2019, to become the technical secretary of Oviedo. In December that year, he agreed to terminate his contract to join Burgos CF in the former capacity. 

In 2022, Michu stated that he was still struggling with chronic pain after retirement, claiming that his 'ankle is that of a 90-year-old' despite undergoing several surgeries.

Personal life
In November 2012, along with fellow Premier League stars Santi Cazorla and Juan Mata, Michu bought shares in former club Oviedo as they struggled to raise €2 million to stay afloat in the Spanish third division. He spoke to the official Swansea website about his love for his former club and the decision saying, "It's my local club, a club I love, so I hope it will be enough."

Michu's older brother Hernán was also a footballer. A midfielder, he too was developed at Oviedo before playing for local sides and subsequently switching to a managerial role; both worked together at Langreo in 2015–16.

Career statistics

Club

International

Honours
Swansea City
Football League Cup: 2012–13

References

External links

1986 births
Living people
Spanish footballers
Footballers from Oviedo
Association football midfielders
Association football forwards
La Liga players
Segunda División players
Segunda División B players
Tercera División players
Real Oviedo players
Celta de Vigo B players
RC Celta de Vigo players
Rayo Vallecano players
UP Langreo footballers
Premier League players
Swansea City A.F.C. players
Serie A players
S.S.C. Napoli players
Spain international footballers
Spanish expatriate footballers
Expatriate footballers in Wales
Expatriate footballers in Italy
Spanish expatriate sportspeople in Wales
Spanish expatriate sportspeople in Italy
Real Oviedo non-playing staff